Deutschland 89 is a German television series, starring Jonas Nay as Martin Rauch, an agent of East Germany following the Fall of the Berlin Wall in 1989. It is a sequel to the 2015 series Deutschland 83, and 2018 series Deutschland 86, and premiered on Amazon Prime Video on 25 September 2020.

Similarly to its two predecessors, the season received positive reception from critics, who mostly saw it as a fitting end to the series.

Plot 

As the Berlin Wall falls, Stasi agents attempt to protect themselves from the fallout.

The character Martin Rauch is told, "Do not imagine you can live a simple life. You now have three options: Either you are killed, you go to court, or you work in a secret service again."

Anna Winger and Jörg Winger, creators and executive producers said: "When the Berlin Wall came down, Germany reinvented itself for the fourth time in the 20th century. Deutschland 89 goes back to the so-called 'end of history'. Our heroes, spies in the national security apparatus of a country that has collapsed overnight, find themselves at a dramatic crossroads, personally and professionally."

Cast

Main
 Jonas Nay as Martin Rauch, a former East German intelligence officer who now works for a state-owned technology company but is forced to return to work as a spy and acts as a double agent.
 Maria Schrader as Lenora Rauch, Martin's aunt and former handler within the Stasi's foreign arm, the Main Directorate for Reconnaissance (HVA) who supplies explosives to the Red Army Faction. 
 Sylvester Groth as Walter Schweppenstette, Lenora's former boss and Martin's father who is sent by the HVA to infiltrate the West German banking system.
 Corinna Harfouch as Beate, an HVA agent posing as Walter's wife in Frankfurt.
 Svenja Jung as Nicole Zangen, teacher of Martin's son Max.
 Fritzi Haberlandt as Tina Fischer, an East German doctor who escaped to West Berlin.
 Lavinia Wilson as Brigitte Winkelmann, Martin's former love interest and a Federal Intelligence Service (BND) agent working with the CIA to recruit former HVA agents.
 Florence Kasumba as Rose Seithathi, an African National Congress (ANC) operative and Lenora's love interest in Deutschland 86.
 Niels Borman as Fritz Hartmann, HVA technical expert and budding entrepreneur.
 Uwe Preuss as Markus Fuchs, a top ranking official in the HVA and Walter's boss.
 Anke Engelke as Barbara Dietrich, a financial consultant in the StäV and Markus' love interest.
 Carina Wiese as Ingrid Rauch, Martin's mother. 
 Alexander Beyer as Tobias Tischbier, Martin's former handler from the HVA
 Raul Casso as Hector Valdez, an officer of the Central Intelligence Agency working in East Berlin with Winkelmann.
 Ari Kurecki as Max, Martin's son.

Recurring 
 Emil Hoștină as Grigore Antonescu, a Romanian national and a member of a terrorist organization who befriends Lenora.
 Rainer Sellien as Carl Baumgarten, a West German musician and a member of a far-left terrorist group whom Martin is tasked to spy on.
 Samia Muriel Chancrin as Sabine Baumgarten, Carl's wife and accomplice. 
 Lena Lauzemis as Nina Rudow, an HVA agent.
 Nicolai Borger as Rolf, the hitman of the far-left terrorist group that Martin infiltrates.
 Mike Davies as John Tyler, a CIA chief working in East Berlin.

Episodes

Production
The initial funding grant of €700,000 ($ US dollars) to UFA Fiction to begin production was approved by the Medienboard Berlin-Brandenburg, and announced on 7 February 2019. In September 2019 RTL confirmed that shooting had begun and was expected to be completed in and around Berlin by the end of 2019.

The headquarters of the former Ministry for State Security (MfS) in Normannenstraße in Berlin was used for shots on location and housed sets for the series.

As with Deutschland 86, there was a production partnership with online service Amazon Video, who provided additional funding. The announcement of Amazon's support for Deutschland 89 came before the release of Deutschland 86.

Broadcast 
Since 25 September 2020, Amazon Prime Video has been streaming the eight new episodes in Germany and Austria. The show began airing in America on Sundance TV on 29 October 2020. The Australian streaming service Stan released the show on 25 September 2020. In the UK the show began airing on More4 from 5 March 2021.

Reception 
Upon airing, the show was met with mostly positive reviews from critics. The Guardian gave a positive review of 4 out of 5 stars, praising the direction of Anna and Joerg Winger. IndieWire gave the series a B grade, praising the ambition of the show but directing criticism towards the overall pacing.

References

External links
 

RTL (German TV channel) original programming
Sundance TV original programming
German-language television shows
Television series about the Cold War
Espionage television series
1989 in Germany
Television series set in 1989
Television series set in East Germany
Works about West Germany
Works about the Stasi
German drama television series